Elenolic acid is a component of olive oil, olive infusion and olive leaf extract.  It can be considered as a marker for maturation of olives.

Oleuropein, a chemical compound found in olive leaf from the olive tree, together with other closely related compounds such as 10-hydroxyoleuropein, ligstroside and 10-hydroxyligstroside, are tyrosol esters of elenolic acid.

References 

Carboxylic acids
Aldehydes
Dihydropyrans
Methyl esters
Olive oil
Olives
Aldehydic acids
Enones